Giorgos Grammatikakis  (born 21 May 1939, in Heraklion) is a Greek physicist, writer, and the dean emeritus of the University of Crete. In 2014, he was elected Member of the European Parliament (MEP).

Life
Giorgos Grammatikakis was born in Heraklion, Greece on 21 May 1939.

Academic career
He studied Physics at the University of Athens and at the Imperial College London. In 1982, he was appointed Professor for Physics at the University of Crete. Interested in the structure of matter and cosmology, he was engaged in the NESTOR Project, an international scientific collaboration to deploy a neutrino telescope on the sea floor off Pylos. In 1990 he was elected Rector of the University of Crete, and served as Chairman of the Ionian University, Corfu. In May 26th, 2010, he was honoured by the Hellenic Physical Society for his contributions to education and science.

He is also a successful author of popular science books on cosmology and physics:

 "Η κόμη της Βερενίκης", 1990/2006, made into a TV series "Αναζητώντας την Βερενίκη" by ERT1.
 "Κοσμογραφήματα", 1999, 
 "Η αυτοβιογραφία του φωτός", 2006, 
 "Συνομιλίες με το φως", 2009, 
 "Ένας αστρολάβος του ουρανού και της ζωής", 2012, 

Grammatikakis has been a member of the Board of Directors of the former state-owned broadcasting corporation ERT and is vice president of the Greek National Opera.

Member of the European Parliament
In the 2014 European Parliament election, he was elected one of two MEPs on the list of the newly founded political party The River. He affiliates with the parliamentary group of the Progressive Alliance of Socialists and Democrats (S&D) and is member of the Committee on Culture and Education and the Delegation to the EU-Russia Parliamentary Cooperation Committee.

References

External links
 
 Member profile on the website of the S&D parliamentary group
 Emeritus profile on the website of the Department of Physics, University of Crete

1939 births
Scientists from Heraklion
Living people
The River (Greece) MEPs
MEPs for Greece 2014–2019
20th-century Greek physicists
Academic staff of the University of Crete